Colomba is a 1918 German silent drama film directed by Arzén von Cserépy and starring Erna Morena, Werner Krauss and Conrad Veidt. It is now considered a lost film.

The film's sets were designed by the art director Ernst Stern.

Plot 
The film is set in Corsica and follows the story of Colomba Carabelli, a young woman determined to avenge her brother's murder by the Orsini family. Colomba convinces a young man named Lydian Orsini to marry her in order to get closer to her enemies. She eventually learns that Lydian is innocent of any wrongdoing regarding her brother's death, and the two fall in love.

Cast
 Erna Morena as Colomba 
 Conrad Veidt as Henrik van Rhyn 
 Werner Krauss as Gonzales 
 Alfred Abel as Juan 
 Maria Forescu
 Hilde Garden
 Valeska Gert

Reception 
Colomba was released in Germany in 1918 and received positive reviews for its cinematography and Darclea's performance in the lead role. The film is considered a rarity, as it is no longer extant today.

References

Bibliography
 John T. Soister. Conrad Veidt on Screen: A Comprehensive Illustrated Filmography. McFarland, 2002.

External links

1918 films
Films of the German Empire
German silent feature films
Films directed by Arzén von Cserépy
German drama films
1918 drama films
German black-and-white films
Films set in Spain
Silent drama films
1910s German films
1910s German-language films